Simon Skou Jakobsen (born 17 November 1990) is a Danish professional footballer who plays as a centre-back for Danish 1st Division club Hobro IK.

Career

Silkeborg
Jakobsen began playing football for HA85 in Hvinningdal, a neighbourhood in Silkeborg. He was later signed to the Silkeborg IF youth academy and started training regularly with their first team in 2009. He made his debut in the 1st Division on 13 April 2009 in a game against FC Fredericia, when he was substituted on the 85th minute. He continued training with the first team through the fall which paid off with a three-year contract.

Jakobsen had to wait more than one year for his debut in the Danish Superliga on 7 August 2010, when he played in a 0–0 draw against AaB. Jakobsen played four more full games that autumn, and Jim Larsen's transfer to Rosenborg led the way for the young defender to play regularly on the first team. Jakobsen signed a -year contract in the spring of 2011.

Hobro
On 27 January 2020, Jakobsen joined Hobro IK on a contract for the rest of the season.

References

External links
 
 

1990 births
Living people
People from Silkeborg
Association football defenders
Danish men's footballers
Silkeborg IF players
Hobro IK players
Danish Superliga players
Danish 1st Division players
Sportspeople from the Central Denmark Region